The 2022 Athletes Unlimited Volleyball season was the Athletes Unlimited Volleyball's second season in existence. The season was played in Dallas, Texas and ran from March 16, 2022 to April 16, 2022.

Bethania de la Cruz was the overall season winner - finishing with 4,652 points.

2022 Roster

Scoring system

Unlike traditional volleyball which is best-of-5 sets, matches in Athletes Unlimited always play three sets. A team does not necessarily have to win the majority or all of the sets as the winner is determined based on the final overall score. If the teams are tied after 3 sets, a tie breaking fourth set (referred to as the "Golden Set) is played. The Golden Set goes to 5 points and must win by two.

MVP Points
After each match, players and members of The Unlimited Club vote for three players who had standout performances.
MVP points are awarded as follows:

MVP 1: +60 points
MVP 2: +40 points
MVP 3: +20 points

Individual stats

In addition to team points and MVP points, players earn points based on their offensive and defensive performance.

The breakdown for individual points is as follows:
Serving: Ace + 12, Error -8
Service error (-8)
Attack: Kill + 8, Error -12
Set: Assist + 1, Error -12
Dig: Dig + 5, No Errors
Pass: Good pass + 2, Error -12
Block: Stuff + 12, No Errors

Captains

At the conclusion of each week, the top four point scorers are named team captains. Each captain is assigned to a team color based on their standing. Captains then choose their team in a weekly draft.

No. 1: Gold
No. 2: Orange
No. 3: Blue
No. 4: Purple

Week 1 Captains: Bethania de la Cruz, Aury Cruz, Karsta Lowe, and Deja McClendon
Week 2 Captains: Dani Drews, Bethania de la Cruz, Natalia Valentín-Anderson, and Lauren Stivrins
Week 3 Captains: Bethania de la Cruz, Karsta Lowe, Dani Drews, and Sheilla Castro
Week 4 Captains: Dani Drews, Bethania de la Cruz, Sheilla Castro, and Natalia Valentín-Anderson
Week 5 Captains: Bethania de la Cruz, Dani Drews, Natalia Valentín-Anderson, and Cassidy Lichtman

Games

Week 1

|-
| rowspan=2 | Wednesday, March 16
| 5:00 PM
| style="background: blue; color: white;"|Team Lowe
| vs
| style="background: orange; color: white;"|Team Cruz
| YouTube
| 77–74 (27–25, 25–27, 25–22)
| Karsta Lowe (22)
| Ali Bastianelli (3)
| Carli Lloyd (40)
| Amanda Benson (19)
|-
| 7:30 PM
| style="background: yellow; color: white;"|Team de la Cruz
| vs
| style="background: purple; color: white;"|Team McClendon
| Bally Sports
| 68–59 (25–13, 18–25, 25–21)
| Dani Drews (10)
| Lauren Stivrins (4)
| Natalia Valentín-Anderson (28)
| Natalia Valentín-Anderson (16)
|-
| rowspan=2 | Friday, March 18
| 6:00 PM
| style="background: purple; color: white;"|Team McClendon
| vs
| style="background: orange; color: white;"|Team Cruz
| FS1
| 71–68 (25–17, 22–25, 24–26)
| Aury Cruz (15)
| Taylor MorganMolly McCageDani Drews (3)
| Natalia Valentín-Anderson (35)
| Morgan Hentz (18)
|-
| 8:30 PM
| style="background: blue; color: white;"|Team Lowe
| vs
| style="background: yellow; color: white;"|Team de la Cruz
| FS2
| 74–78 (24–26, 21–25, 29–27)
|  Karsta Lowe  Lindsay StalzerBethania de la Cruz (13)
| Lauren Stivrins (4)
| Carli Lloyd (35)
| Amanda Benson (17)
|-
| rowspan=2 | Saturday, March 19
| 6:00 PM
| style="background: purple; color: white;"|Team McClendon
| vs
| style="background: blue; color: white;"|Team Lowe
| FS2
| 76–58(25–23, 26–24, 25–11)
| Dani Drews (16)
| Rachael Fara (3)
| Natalia Valentín-Anderson (43)
| Carli Lloyd  Nomaris Velez Agosto (13)
|-
| 9:30 p.m.
| style="background: orange; color: white;"|Team Cruz
| vs
| style="background: yellow; color: white;"|Team de la Cruz
| Bally Sports
| 69–71 (19–25, 25–23, 25–23)
| Kalei MauFalyn FonoimoanaMadison Villindes (10)
| Molly McCage (4)
| Nootsara Tomkom (28)
| Morgan Hentz (16)

Week 2

|-
| rowspan=2 | Wednesday, March 23
| 6:30 p.m.
| style="background: blue; color: white;"|Natalia Valentín-Anderson
| vs
| style="background: orange; color: white;"|Team de la Cruz
| YouTube
| 75–80 (23–25, 20–25, 32–30)
| Bethania de la Cruz (22)
| Ali Bastianelli (5)
| Nootsara Tomkom (45)
| Nomaris Velez AgostoBethania de la Cruz (18)
|-
| 7:30 PM
| style="background: yellow; color: white;"|Team Drews
| vs
| style="background: purple; color: white;"|Team Stivrins
| Bally Sports
| 69–64  (19–25, 25–22, 25–17)
| Dani Drews (16)
| Taylor MorganJenna RosenthalRonika Stone (3)
| Carli Lloyd (27)
| Amanda Benson (17)
|-
| rowspan=2 | Friday, March 25
| 6:00 PM
| style="background: purple; color: white;"|Team Stivrins
| vs
| style="background: orange; color: white;"|Team de la Cruz
| FS2
| 71–70 (26–24, 25–21, 20–25)
| Bethania de la Cruz (27)
| Eri Xue (4)
| Nootsara Tomkom (43)
| Erin Fairs (19)
|-
| 8:30 PM
| style="background: blue; color: white;"|Team Valentín-Anderson
| vs
| style="background: yellow; color: white;"|Team Drews
| FS2
| 70–66 (25–21, 20–25, 25–20)
| Karsta LoweDani Drews (18)
| Taylor MorganAli BastianelliCarli LloydTaylor SandbotheMadison VillinesJenna Rosenthal (2)
| Carli LloydNatalia Valentín-Anderson (33)
| Amanda Benson (19)
|-
| rowspan=2 | Saturday, March 26
| 6:30 PM
| style="background: purple; color: white;"|Team Stivrins
| vs
| style="background: blue; color: white;"|Team Valentín-Anderson
| FS2
| 70–73 (22–25, 23–25, 25–23)
| Leah Edmond (19)
| Madison Villines (3)
| Natalia Valentín-Anderson (37)
| Morgan Hentz (16)
|-
| 9:00 PM
| style="background: orange; color: white;"|Team de la Cruz
| vs
| style="background: yellow; color: white;"|Team Drews
| Bally Sports
| 68–57 (18–25, 25–9, 25–23)
| Sheilla Castro (17)
| Bethania de la Cruz (3)
| Nootsara Tomkom (36)
| Nomaris Velez Agosto (12)

Week 3

|-
| rowspan=2 | Wednesday, March 30
| 5:00 PM
| style="background: blue; color: white;"|Team Drews
| vs
| style="background: orange; color: white;"|Team Lowe
| YouTube
| 75–66 (25–27, 25–21, 25–18)
| Leah Edmond (18)
| Karsta LoweMadison VillinesRonika StoneLeah EdmondDani Drews (2)
| Natalia Valentín-Anderson (41)
| Karsta Lowe (21)
|-
| 7:30
| style="background: yellow; color: white;"|Team de la Cruz
| vs
| style="background: purple; color: white;"|Team Sheilla
| Bally Sports
| 61–72 (25–22, 18–25, 25–18)
| Sheilla Castro (16)
| Taylor MorganAli Bastianelli (2)
| Nootsara Tomkom (13)
| Nootsara Tomkom (13)
|-
| rowspan=2 | Friday, April 1
| 6:00 PM
| style="background: purple; color: white;"|Team Sheilla
| vs
| style="background: orange; color: white;"|Team Lowe
| FS2
| 83–81 (19–25, 25–19, 39–37)
| Sheilla Castro (23)
| Ali Bastianelli (6)
| Alisha Glass Childress (37)
| Hana Lishman (15)
|-
| 8:30 PM
| style="background: blue; color: white;"|Team Drews
| vs
| style="background: yellow; color: white;"|Team de la Cruz
| FS2
| 77–59 (25–17, 27–25, 25–17)
| Dani Drews (20)
| Taylor Morgan (3)
| Natalia Valentín-Anderson (39)
| Morgan Hentz (12)
|-
| rowspan=2 | Saturday, April 2
| 6:00 PM
| style="background: purple; color: white;"|Team Sheilla
| vs
| style="background: blue; color: white;"|Team Drews
| CBS Sports
| 67–73 (20–25, 25–23, 22–25)
| Jamie PetersonErin FairsDani Drews (11)
| Ronika Stone (5)
| Natalia Valentín-Anderson (34)
| Morgan Hentz (14)
|-
| 8:00 PM
| style="background: orange; color: white;"|Team Lowe
| vs
| style="background: yellow; color: white;"|Team de la Cruz
| CBS Sports Network
| 63–61 (23–25, 15–25, 25–11)
| Madison VillinesBethania de la Cruz (15)
| Naya CrittendenTaylor SandbotheLindsay Stalzer (2)
| Carli Lloyd (25)
| Nomaris Velez Agonsto (18)

Week 4

|-
| rowspan=2 | Wednesday, April 6
| 5:00 PM
| style="background: blue; color: white;"|Team Sheilla
| vs
| style="background: orange; color: white;"|Team de la Cruz
| YouTube
| 60–75 (22–25, 16–25, 22–25)
| Bethania de la Cruz (15)
| Ronika StoneCassidy Lichtman (3)
| Alisha Glass Childress (38)
| Nomaris Velez Agosto (14)
|-
| 7:30
| style="background: yellow; color: white;"|Team Drews
| vs
| style="background: purple; color: white;"|Team Valentín-Anderson
| YouTube
| 61–72 (18–25, 18–25, 25–22)
| Dani Drews (18)
| Taylor SandbotheJenna RosenthalLeah EdmondDani Drews (2)
| Natalia Valentín-Anderson (36)
| Falyn Fonoimoana (17)
|-
| rowspan=2 | Friday, April 8
| 6:00 PM
| style="background: purple; color: white;"|Team Valentín-Anderson
| vs
| style="background: orange; color: white;"|Team de la Cruz
| FS2
| 72–69 (22–25, 25–23, 25–21)
| Jenna RosenthalBethania de la Cruz (16)
| Molly McCage (5)
| Natalia Valentín-Anderson (48)
| Natalia Valentín-Anderson (17)
|-
| 9:00 PM
| style="background: blue; color: white;"|Team Sheilla
| vs
| style="background: yellow; color: white;"|Team Drews
| CBS Sports Network
| 75–56 (25–19, 25–20, 25–17)
| Dani Drews (13)
| Carli Lloyd (4)
| Nootsara Tomkom (28)
| Morgan Hentz (20)
|-
| rowspan=2 | Saturday, April 9
| 4:00 PM
|  style="background: purple; color: white;"|Team Valentín-Anderson
| vs
| style="background: blue; color: white;"|Team Sheilla
| CBS Sports Network
| 54–75 (15–25, 22–25, 17–25)
| Lindsay StalzerLeah Edmond (12)
| Taylor MorganLianna SybeldonEri XueKalei MauAli BastianelliSheilla CastroNatalia Valentín-Anderson (1)
| Natalia Valentín-Anderson (31)
| Amanda Benson (17)
|-
| 7:00 PM
| style="background: orange; color: white;"|Team de la Cruz
| vs
| style="background: yellow; color: white;"|Team Drews
| CBS Sports Network
| 73–64 (25–19, 25–20, 23–25)
| Bethania de la Cruz (18)
| Molly McCage (4)
| Alisha Glass Childress (33)
| Nomaris Velez Agosto (17)

Week 5

|-
| rowspan=2 | Wednesday, April 14
| 7:00 PM
| style="background: blue; color: white;"|Team Valentín-Anderson
| vs
| style="background: orange; color: white;"|Team Drews
| CBS Sports Network
| 71–67 (21–25, 25–19, 25–23)
| Dani Drews (15)
| Taylor Sandbothe (4)
| Natalia Valentín-Anderson (33)
| Hana Lishman (22)
|-
| 9:00 PM
| style="background: yellow; color: white;"|Team de la Cruz
| vs
| style="background: purple; color: white;"|Team Lichtman
| CBS Sports Network
| 71–66 (25–20, 21–25, 25–21)
| Bethania de la Cruz (19)
| Cassidy Lichtman (3)
| Nootsara Tomkom (43)
| Morgan Hentz (16)
|-
| rowspan=2 | Friday, April 15
| 6:00 PM
| style="background: purple; color: white;"|Team Lichtman
| vs
| style="background: orange; color: white;"|Team Drews
| FS2
| 68–65 (25–17, 25–23, 18–25)
| Leah Edmond (14)
| Molly McCageLianna Sybeldon (4)
| Alisha Glass Childress (22)
| Morgan Hentz (16)
|-
| 9:00 PM
| style="background: blue; color: white;"|Team Valentín-Anderson
| vs
| style="background: yellow; color: white;"|Team de la Cruz
| CBS Sports Network
| 61–75 (19–25, 23–25, 19–25)
| Bethania de la Cruz (17)
| Jenna Rosenthal (3)
| Nootsara Tomkom (42)
| Bethania de la Cruz (17)
|-
| rowspan=2 | Saturday, April 16
| 6:00 PM
|  style="background: purple; color: white;"|Team Lichtman
| vs
| style="background: blue; color: white;"|Team Valentín-Anderson
| FS2
| 78–76 (25–20, 28–26, 18–25, 7–5)
| Jamie Peterson (17)
| Eri XueTaylor Sandbothe (3)
| Alisha Glass Childress (35)
| Morgan Hentz (21)
|-
| 9:00 PM
| style="background: orange; color: white;"|Team Drews
| vs
| style="background: yellow; color: white;"|Team de la Cruz
| CBS Sports Network
| 73–76 (23–25, 22–25, 28–26)
| Bethania de la Cruz (19)
| Ray SantosLianna SybeldonErin FairsBethania de la Cruz (2)
| Nootsara Tomkom (41)
| Nomaris Velez Agosto (22)

Leaderboard
Below is the leaderboard which tallies the total points earned via the scoring system that each player has accumulated during the games that are played each week. The list reflects the final standings.

Team Captain Records

Awards

The following players were named to the 2022 Dream Team:

 Champion/MVP
 
 Best Setter
 
 Best Outside Hitters
 
 

 Best Middle Blockers
 
 
 Best Opposite
 
 Best Libero
 

Hentz was also named the Defensive Player of the Year.

References

Women's volleyball
2022 in women's volleyball
Athletes Unlimited Volleyball
Athletes Unlimited Volleyball
Volleyball in Texas
Sports competitions in Dallas